is a type of Japanese confection. It consists of two small pancake-like patties made from castella wrapped around a filling of sweet azuki bean paste.

The original dorayaki consisted of only one layer. Its current shape was invented in 1914 by Usagiya in the Ueno district of Tokyo.

In Japanese, dora means "gong", and because of the similarity of the shapes, this is probably the origin of the name of the sweet. Legend has it that the first dorayaki were made when a samurai named Benkei forgot his gong (dora) upon leaving a farmer's home where he was hiding, and the farmer subsequently used the gong to fry the pancakes.

Regional variation
In the Kansai area, this sweet is often called mikasa. The word originally means triple straw hat, but is also an alternative name of Mount Wakakusa, a low hill with gentle slopes located in Nara. In Nara, a larger mikasa of about 30 cm in diameter is made.

In popular culture
The Japanese manga and anime character Doraemon loves dorayaki and so it is depicted as his favourite food (in the English dub, Nobita (Noby) calls it "yummy buns" as an alternative), and it has been a plot device several times throughout the series. Doraemon is addicted to dorayaki and falls for any trap involving them. Since 2000, the company Bunmeido has been selling a limited version of dorayaki called Doraemon Dorayaki every year around March and September. Since 2015, JFC International has produced Doraemon Dorayaki for the North American market.

In 2015 filmmaker Naomi Kawase released the film "An" ("Sweet Bean"), based on a novel by Durian Sukegawa, about an elderly woman who has a secret recipe for truly transcendent dorayaki anko.

See also
Japonesa - a similar confection eaten in Spain and Gibraltar
Apam balik - a pancake-like confection in Malaysia, Indonesia, Brunei and Singapore
Chalbori-ppang - a similar confection originating in Korea

References

External links
About.com's dorayaki recipe
How to make Dorayaki 

Wagashi
Japanese confectionery